Stenoglene bipunctatus is a moth of the  family Eupterotidae. It can be found in the Republic of the Congo and in Malawi.

It has a wingspan of 54mm and the holotype provided from Bayengue.

Subspecies
Stenoglene bipunctatus bipunctatus Aurivillius, 1909 (Congo)
Stenoglene bipunctatus inversus (Gaede, 1927) (Malawi)

References

Moths described in 1909
Janinae
Lepidoptera of the Democratic Republic of the Congo
Lepidoptera of the Republic of the Congo
Lepidoptera of Malawi
Moths of Sub-Saharan Africa